Proba-3 is a technological demonstration mission by the European Space Agency devoted to high precision formation flying to achieve scientific coronagraphy. It is part of the series of PROBA satellites that are being used to validate new spacecraft technologies and concepts while also carrying scientific instruments.

History
The mission concept dates back to 2005 when a study was performed in the ESA CDF. After several phase A studies and a change of industrial organisation at the beginning of the phase B, the mission's implementation phase (Phases C/D/E1) eventually began in July 2014.

The system CDR has been closed in 2018.

Mission concept
Proba-3 consists of two independent, three-axis stabilized spacecraft: the Coronagraph Spacecraft (CSC) and the Occulter Spacecraft (OSC).
Both spacecraft will fly close to each other on a highly elliptical orbit around the Earth, with an apogee at 60,500 km altitude.

Along the apogee arc, when the gravity gradient is significantly smaller, the two spacecraft will autonomously acquire a formation configuration, such that the CSC remains at a fixed position in the shadow cast by the OSC. The CSC hosts a coronagraph which will then be able to observe the Sun Corona without being blinded by the intense light from the photosphere.
Given the diameter of the occulter disk on the OSC and the intended Corona observation regions, the CSC must be at approximately 150 meters from the OSC, and maintain this position with millimetric accuracy, both in range and laterally. The scientific objective is to observe the Corona down to about 1.1 solar radius in the visible wavelength range.

Besides formation flying for coronagraphy, some formation flying demonstration manoeuvers (retargeting and resizing manoeuvers) will be attempted during the apogee phase of the orbit, as well as a space rendezvous experiment.

The formation acquisition and control is performed on-board thanks to a set of metrology equipment and actuators. The metrology equipment comprise a laser based system providing high accuracy relative position estimate, a visual based sensor with a coarser precision but wider field of view, and a shadow position sensor providing finest precision when the CSC is in the vicinity of the target position in the shadow cone.

After the apogee arc, the formation is broken by impulsive manoeuvers executed by the S/C. The 2 S/C are placed on a relative trajectory that passively ensures no risk of collision during the perigee passage, when the spacecraft altitude goes down to 600 km. 
Along the perigee phase of the orbit, the 2 S/C acquire GNSS data to derive a precise estimation of the relative position and velocity that is propagated for a few hours up to the reacquisition of the metrology before the next apogee arc.

The CSC and OSC exchange sensor data and commands through a RF based inter-satellite link to coordinate their activities.

Design

CSC and OSC Spacecraft
The CSC is a 300 kg mini-satellite, hosting the coronagraph ASPIICS and the shadow position sensors. It is equipped with a mono-propellant propulsion system to perform the large delta-V manoeuver necessary for formation acquisition and breaking. It also hosts the targets used by the metrology optical heads on board the OSC.

The OSC is a 250 kg mini-satellite, hosting the laser and visual metrology optical heads. It features the occulter disk that is 1.4 meter in diameter. The shape of its rim is intended to reduce the amount of sun diffracted light entering the coronagraph.
The OSC uses a low-thrust cold gas propulsion system that enables the fine position control required for the formation flying.

Science Payloads
The primary payload is the ASPIICS Coronagraph. Its follows the design concept of a classical externally occulted Lyot coronagraph, with the external occulter physically attached to the OSC while the rest of the instrument is on the CSC.

ASPIICS will observe the solar corona  through refractive optics, able to select 3 different spectral bands: Fe XIV line @ 530.4 nm, He I D3 line @587.7 nm, and the white-light spectral band [540;570 nm].

It is expected that the data from ASPIICS will fill the gap in term of field of view between EUV imagers and externally occulted coronagraphs, when the latter are monolithic instruments that don't benefit from the longer distance enabled by formation flying.

The Principal Investigator for the coronagraph instrument is from Royal Observatory of Belgium.

A secondary scientific payload (DARA) is hosted on the OSC. DARA stands for Davos Absolute Radiometer and is an absolute radiometer for measuring Total Solar Irradiance (TSI).

Ground Segment and Operations
Like the other Proba satellites, PROBA-3 will be operated from the ESA center in Redu, Belgium.

Project Development
Proba-3 is a project managed by the European Space Agency. The industrial development of the S/C and the ground segment is led by SENER Aerospace which coordinates the work of a core team with Airbus Defence and Space, Qinetiq Space, GMV, Celestia Antwerp BV and Spacebel.

The Coronagraph payload is developed for ESA by a consortium led by  Liège Space Center (CSL) in Belgium, made up of 15 companies and institutes from five ESA Member States.

DARA is provided by the PMOD institute in Switzerland.

Testing of the mission's vision-based sensor system was performed at ESA's ESTEC technical centre in the Netherlands in March 2021. The system will enable the two spacecraft to fly in a precise formation. The testing reportedly yielded promising results.

See also
 Prisma
 ESA's PROBA missions:
 PROBA-1
 PROBA-2
 PROBA-V

References

External links
 
 eoPortal PROBA-3 page

European Space Agency satellites
Proposed satellites
2024 in spaceflight
Solar space observatories
Technology demonstrations